Young at Heart is an album by The Ray Conniff Singers. It was released in 1960 on the Columbia label (catalog no. CL-1489).

The album debuted on Billboard magazine's popular albums chart on August 15, 1960, peaked at No. 6, and remained on that chart for 13 weeks.

AllMusic later gave the album a rating of three stars. Reviewer Greg Adams wrote that Conniff's "expert arranging skills and the talent of his chorus are on prominent display."

Track listing
Side 1
 "Remember" (Irving Berlin) [2:18]
 "You'll Never Know" (Harry Warren, Mack Gordond) [3:22]
 "Dancing with Tears in My Eyes" (Al Dubin, Joe Burke) [3:16]
 "I'm in the Mood for Love" (Jimmy McHugh, Dorothy Fields) [2:27]
 "I'll Be Seeing You" (Irving Kahal, Sammy Fain) [2:55]
 "It's Dark On Observatory Hill" (Harold Spina, Johnny Burke) [2:34]

Side 2
 "These Foolish Things (Remind Me of You)" (Harry Link, Holt Marvell, Jack Strachey) [2:24]
 "Ma! He's Making Eyes at Me" (Con Conrad, Sidney Clare) [2:10]
 "Young At Heart" (Carolyn Leigh, Johnny Richards) [2:24]
 "If I Loved You" (Rodgers and Hammerstein) [2:37]
 "Harbor Lights" (Hugh Williams, Jimmy Kennedy) [2:32]
 "I'll See You In My Dreams" (Gus Kahn, Isham Jones) [2:13]

References

1960 albums
Columbia Records albums
Ray Conniff albums